Carbonless copy paper (CCP), non-carbon copy paper, or NCR paper (No Carbon Required, taken from the initials of its creator, National Cash Register) is a type of coated paper designed to transfer information written on the front onto sheets beneath. It was developed by chemists Lowell Schleicher and Barry Green, as an alternative to carbon paper and is sometimes misidentified as such.

Carbonless copying provides an alternative to the use of carbon copying. Carbonless copy paper has micro-encapsulated dye or ink on the back side of the top sheet, and a clay coating on the front side of the bottom sheet. When pressure is applied (from writing or impact printing), the dye capsules rupture and react with the clay to duplicate the markings made to the top sheet. Intermediary sheets, with clay on the front and dye capsules on the back, can be used to create multiple copies; this may be referred to as multipart stationery.

Operation 
Carbonless copy paper consists of sheets of paper that are coated with micro-encapsulated dye or ink or a reactive clay. The back of the first sheet is coated with micro-encapsulated dye (referred to as a Coated Back or CB sheet). The lowermost sheet is coated on the top surface with a clay that quickly reacts with the dye to form a permanent mark (Coated Front, CF). Any intermediate sheets are coated with clay on top and dye on the bottom (Coated Front and Back, CFB).

When the sheets are written on with pressure (e.g., ball-point pen) or impact (e.g., typewriter, dot-matrix printer), the pressure causes the micro-capsules to break and release their dye. Since the capsules are so small, the resulting print is very accurate.

Carbonless copy paper was also available in a self-contained version that had both the ink and the clay on the same side of the paper.

Uses 
Carbonless copy paper was first produced by the NCR Corporation, applying for a patent on June 30, 1953. Formerly, the options were to write documents more than once or use carbon paper, which was inserted between the sheet being written upon and the copy. Carbonless paper was used as business stationery requiring one or more copies of the original, such as invoices and receipts. The copies were often paper of different colors (e.g., white original for customer, yellow copy for supplier's records, and other colors for subsequent copies). Stationery with carbonless copy paper can be supplied collated either in pads or books bound into sets, or as loose sets, or as continuous stationery for printers designed to use it.

Dyes and chemicals 
The first dye used commercially in this application was crystal violet lactone, which is widely used today. Other dyes and supporting chemicals used are PTSMH (p-toluene sulfinate of Michler's hydrol), TMA (trimellitic anhydride), phenol-formaldehyde resins, azo dyes, DIPN (diisopropylnaphthalenes, formaldehyde isocyanates, hydrocarbon-based solvents, polycyclic aromatic hydrocarbons, polyoxypropylene diamine, epoxy resins, aliphatic isocyanates, bisphenol A, diethylene triamine, and others. The dyes in carbonless copy papers may cause contact dermatitis in sensitive persons.

Health and environmental concerns 
Until the 1970s, when the use of polychlorinated biphenyls (PCBs) was banned due to health and environmental concerns, PCBs were used as a transfer agent in carbonless copy paper. PCBs are readily transferred to human skin during handling of such papers, and it is difficult to achieve decontamination by ordinary washing with soap and water. In Japan, carbonless copy paper is still treated as a PCB-contaminated waste.

Exposure to certain types of carbonless copy paper or its components has resulted, under some conditions, in mild to moderate symptoms of skin irritation and irritation of the mucosal membranes of the eyes and upper respiratory tract. A 2000 review found no irritation or sensitization on contact with carbonless copy paper produced after 1987. In most cases, good industrial hygiene and work practices should be adequate to reduce or eliminate symptoms. These include adequate ventilation, humidity, and temperature controls; proper housekeeping; minimal hand-to-mouth and hand-to-eye contact; and periodic cleansing of hands.

In a 1997 study, the University of Florida found that a poorly-ventilated office where large amounts of carbonless copy paper were used had significant levels of volatile organic compounds present in its air, whereas a well-ventilated office where little such paper was used did not. The study also found that there were higher rates of sick leave and illness complaints at the office using large amounts of carbonless copy paper. Another study, which was published in Environmental Health Perspectives, connected chronic occupational exposure to paper dust and carbonless copy paper with an increased risk of adult-onset asthma.

The average carbonless copy paper contains a high concentration of bisphenol A (BPA), an endocrine disruptor.

In 2001, three employees of a medical center in San Francisco filed a lawsuit against their employer, blaming exposure to carbonless copy paper and other chemicals for their inflammatory breast cancer.

With the increasing adoption of inexpensive inkjet printers and laser printers on computer systems since the 1980s, the use of carbonless multipart forms in businesses has declined, as it is simpler to make copies of documents.

See also 
 Carbon copy
 Carbon paper
 Spirit duplicator AKA Ditto machine
 List of duplicating processes

Notes

References 

 U. of FLA News
 Business Weeks Expose'
  A Paper Trail

External links 
 Patent: Pressure-sensitive record material
 Hazard Review: Carbonless Copy Paper, from the National Institute for Occupational Safety and Health.
 Scientist Test Carbonless Copy Paper for Sickening Side Effect

Coated paper
Paper
Occupational safety and health
American inventions
NCR Corporation products

de:Durchschreibepapier#Durchschreibepapiere ohne Kohleschicht